Grays Mountain is a mountain located in the Catskill Mountains of New York southeast of Bovina Center. Grays Mountain is located south of Mount Pisgah, southwest of Farmers Hill, west-northwest of Fords Hill and north of Dingle Hill.

References

Mountains of Delaware County, New York
Mountains of New York (state)